Mohawk is a 1956 American adventure western romance film directed by Kurt Neumann, starring Scott Brady, Rita Gam and Neville Brand. The picture is about an 18th century Boston artist sent to the Mohawk Valley to paint landscapes and portraits of Native Americans.

Several sections of the plot are taken from the 1939 film Drums Along the Mohawk and loosely refers to the 1778 Cherry Valley massacre (as does the main antagonist Butler to the historic figure of loyalist officer Walter Butler).

Plot
In late 18th century upstate New York, a quarrelsome white man named Butler seeks to foment war between the Continental Army garrison of Fort Alden and the Indians, to rid the Mohawk Valley of the natives and white settlers he despises. He goes to the Iroquois chef Kowanen to warn him about a party of armed white settlers. Kowanen shows no concern, but his son Keoga and brave Rokhawah feel otherwise and plot a raid to steal the settlers' muskets. They are assisted by Keoga's sister Onida, but many Indians end up killed and Onida captured.

An artist, Jonathan Adams, has arrived in Fort Alden from Boston, commissioned to do paintings and portraits. He is joined by sweetheart Cynthia Stanhope, a society lady from Boston, and attracted to Greta Jones, a local barmaid. But when he escorts Onida from the fort back to her people, he develops a romantic interest in her instead. Adams also earns the respect and trust of Kowanen as he paints the chief's portrait and Keoga comes to admire Adams' fighting prowess. Kowanen, seeking peace with the white settlers, offers to have his son Keoga accompany Adams back to the fort, as a sign of good faith.

As the two peace emissaries are en route to the fort, Butler stages an ambush, shooting and murdering Keoga in Adams' company. Adams does not see who fired the shot. He takes Keoga's body back to his tribe who plan a war.

Chief Kowanen's men hold the whites responsible and take Adams captive, and are going to burn him at the stake. Onida kills one of her own tribe and helps him escape. When Adams finally reaches the fort, he confronts Butler and Butler's knowledge of the murder reveals his guilt. As the enraged Indians attack, Butler is cast out of the besieged fort and meets his end in a hail of Indian arrows. A truce is declared, and while Cynthia goes back to Boston with his works of art, Adams remains behind to be with Onida.

Cast
 Scott Brady as Jonathan Adams
 Rita Gam as Onida
 Neville Brand as Rokhawah
 Lori Nelson as Cynthia Stanhope
 Allison Hayes as Greta Jones
 John Hoyt as Butler
 Rhys Williams as Clem Jones
 Barbara Jo Allen as Aunt Agatha (as Vera Vague)
 Mae Clarke as Minikah
 Tommy Cook as Keoga
 Ted de Corsia as Indian Chief Kowanen
 Michael Granger as Priest
 John Hudson as Captain Langley

See also
List of American films of 1956

External links 
 
 
 
 

1956 films
American Indian Wars films
American historical drama films
American Western (genre) films
1956 Western (genre) films
Films set in the 18th century
Films set in New York (state)
Films directed by Kurt Neumann
20th Century Fox films
1950s historical drama films
1956 drama films
1950s English-language films
1950s American films